SciFinal was launched in October 2009 by StoryForge LLC as an online directory for independent science fiction web series.

SciFinal has been described as “the best place to get your fix of nerdy webisodes” by Autumn on geeksix.  The site allows producers to create their own show page and promote their web series for free, and as of June 9, 2010 boasts over 120 independent science fiction web series listed, including: Zomblogalypse, The Adventures of Humphrey & Spud, Heroes of the North and The Mercury Men.  The idea for having a website that showcased indie sci-fi productions was developed by SciFinal's creators when they wanted to promote their own web series: Zerks Log.  Steve Lettieri, co-founder of SciFinal said they "found it really challenging to get noticed by the sci-fi blogs and websites" when trying to market Zerks Log.

References

External links 
 Official Website
 SciFinal Channel

Science fiction websites